Nobukazu (written: 延和, 伸和 or 信美) is a masculine Japanese given name. Notable people with the name include:

 (born 1969), Japanese professional wrestler
 (1793–1836), Japanese daimyō
 (born 1968), Japanese musician

Japanese masculine given names